WearEver Cookware can trace its origins back to 1888 when Charles Martin Hall, a young inventor from Oberlin, Ohio discovered an inexpensive way to smelt aluminum by perfecting the electrochemical reduction process that extracted aluminum from bauxite ore. Seeking to fund his continued exploration of this new process Hall eventually partnered with Alfred E. Hunt, a metallurgist in charge of the Pittsburgh Testing Laboratory, raising $20,000 with the help of investors and eventually forming the Pittsburgh Reduction Company which would later come to be known as the Aluminum Company of America (ALCOA).

These new processes introduced two new challenges to ALCOA; they would need to generate a market and encourage manufacturers to use this new aluminum and they would need to increase production in order to cut costs through economies of scale.

WearEver cookware was the method through which these challenges were met. WearEver Cookware  helped aluminum consumption by introducing one of the first widely accepted and available aluminum based consumer products of their time. Initially this cookware was sold door-to-door by college students and would later be purchased in large quantities by organizations. In 1912, the United States Marine Corps would adopt WearEver aluminum utensils as their standard issue utensils.

Groupe SEB acquired Mirro WearEver, a subsidiary of Global Home Products, for approximately $36.5 million in 2006. The acquisition included all inventories, trade receivables, factory and equipment in Nuevo Laredo, Mexico, and trademarks.

References 

Williams, Charles E. (2006) "Along the Allegheny River: The Southern Watershed"

External links
The Marshall Johnson Collection of Trade Literature and Ephemera at Hagley Museum and Library consists of materials collected by Johnson during his time with Wear-Ever/Proctor-Silex, including product catalogs, news clippings, and advertisements, with a small amount of manuscript materials.
The Marshall Johnson Collection of Cookware and Appliance Design Drawings at Hagley Museum and Library consists of various drawings which detail the conception and design of household consumer goods produced by Wear-Ever Aluminum, Inc., a subsidiary of the Aluminum Company of America (Alcoa).

Manufacturing companies of the United States
Kitchenware brands
1888 establishments in Pennsylvania
American companies established in 1888
Manufacturing companies established in 1888